Vir Das (born 31 May 1979) is an Indian comedian, actor and musician. After beginning a career in standup comedy, Das moved to Hindi cinema starring in films like  Badmaash Company (2010), Delhi Belly (2011), and Go Goa Gone (2013) in supporting roles. In 2017, he acted in the Netflix special Abroad Understanding. Das has performed in approximately 35 plays, over 100 stand-up comedy shows, 18 films, eight TV shows and six comedy specials. He has written comedic columns for Femina, Maxim, Exotica, DNA and Tehelka. In 2019, he made his debut in American television with the television series, Whiskey Cavalier.

Personal life 
Vir Das was born to Ranu Das and Madhur Das in Dehradun on 31 May 1979. He was raised in Nigeria and India. In Nigeria, he attended the Indian Language School in Lagos, Nigeria. In India, he attended The Lawrence School, Sanawar and Delhi Public School, Noida. After 18 months at Sri Venkateswara College, University of Delhi he went to the United States. There he obtained a bachelor's degree from Knox College, Galesburg, Illinois in Economics and Theatre with a concentration in performance. After graduating from Knox, Das was accepted into the Harvard University's and Moscow Arts Theatre for their joint Stanislavsky Program. He has a sister Trisha, who is four years elder to him and is a published author and a documentary filmmaker. He has claimed in one of his shows that his grandfather was a Padma Shri awardee from Bengal. He married his girlfriend of five years, Shivani Mathur, in October 2014.

Controversies

Vir Das Two Indias
Vir Das has been under fire for performing "Two Indias" in 2021. He spoke of two drastically different sides of his native India: rich and poor, united but also divided over politics, women's rights, Bollywood films and cricket teams. It was a comedy show that elicited two very different responses from Indians living in the USA versus back in India. Seven legal cases have been filed against Das.

Vir Das, Netflix v AGP World
In November 2022 Mumbai police have issued a FIR against Vir Das and two other persons and online streaming platform Netflix on charges of copyright rules violation  following a complaint by noted theatre producer Ashvin Gidwani of AGP World.

Career 
He began his career with a gig at one of the premier hotel in New Delhi with a performance titled "Walking on Broken Das".

Das started his career on TV when he hosted two TV shows on Zoom. The first one was Is Route Ki Sabhin Linein Maast Hain where he was an agony uncle. The second was his own stand-up comedy late night show Ek Rahin Vir. Das also hosted Top Drive - Getaway for Star World.

Das has appeared on a variety of comedic television programs. He hosted Cricket Firsts, a sports comedy show on Zee Sports (now TEN Action+). He did improvisational comedy on SAB TV's Lo Kar Lo Baat. He was an addition to the cast of The Great Indian Comedy Show on STAR One. He can be seen anchoring Now Not Showing on CNN-IBN.

Das is the host of News on the Loose, his own news comedy show on CNBC-TV18. News on the Loose was given its own weekly half-hour special News On The Loose — Weekend on CNBC-TV18.

Das was cast as the comic relief in The Curse of King Tut's Tomb, a Hallmark mini-series filmed in India. He began filming for his first two Bollywood roles in early 2006. He played a small role Vipul Shah's 2007 movie Namastey London.

Vir Das has also worked with Ashvin Gidwani Productions-AGP on stand-up shows like Walking on Broken Das, Battle of Da Sexes, and History of India: VIRitten, which he wrote and directed.

He performed at Edinburgh Festival Fringe in 2011 and in 2022.

On 25 April 2017, Das's Netflix special Abroad Understanding was released, in the process becoming the first Indian comedian with a comedy special on the platform.

In June 2017 Das was named one of Variety's "10 Comics to Watch for 2017."

In December 2018, Das released his second Netflix comedy special, entitled Losing It.

In 2019, Das released his travel-cum-comedy show Jestination Unknown where he explores how Indians see humour along with a couple of other stand-up comedians and celebrities.

He starred opposite Preity Zinta in a Fresh Off the Boat episode titled "The Magic Motor Inn". He plays the patriarch of an Indian family. Das's onscreen family will be at the center of the plot of the official spin-off of the same show.

During the lockdown in 2020 he was on Netflix in a one-hour special called Vir Das: Outside In.

On 12 November 2021, Das performed a monologue titled "Two Indias" at the Kennedy Center in Washington.

On 29 January 2023, Das appeared on the Conan O'Brien Needs a Friend podcast and discussed faking appendicitis as a child, the first laugh he ever got on stage, the controversy over his “Two Indias” monologue, and his new special Vir Das: Landing.

Filmography

Film

Television

Web

References

External links 

 History of India – 2010
 Vir Das at Chakpak.com
 YouTube

1979 births
Living people
21st-century Indian male actors
Knox College (Illinois) alumni
Indian male comedians
Indian male television actors
Indian stand-up comedians
Male actors from Dehradun
Male actors in Hindi cinema